Hristo Stamboliyski (born 2 March 1992) is a Bulgarian footballer, who currently plays as a defender for Svetkavitsa.

References

External links

Living people
1992 births
Bulgarian footballers
Association football defenders
PFC Svetkavitsa players
First Professional Football League (Bulgaria) players